Abena Amoah is one of Ghana's leading female investment bankers and financial advisors. On July 15, 2020, she was appointed as the Deputy Managing Director of the Ghana Stock Exchange. In this position Ms. Amoah is responsible for the operational activities of the Exchange as well as assisting the managing director in defining and implementing the Exchange's corporate strategies and plans. Prior to this appointment, Abena was the chief executive officer for Baobab Advisors, a financial advisory services firm she founded. Amoah has served on the boards of Wapic Insurance Limited (Ghana), Access Bank Limited (Ghana) and The African Women's Development Fund. She received a Newmont Gold Ghana Highest Award for Excellence at the National Youth Excellence Awards in 2006. And was listed as one of WomanRising's 100 Most Outstanding Women Entrepreneurs in Ghana in 2016.

Education
Abena Amoah graduated from the University of Ghana Business School with a first class honor bachelor's degree in Administration.  She had her secondary school education at St Roses Senior High School in the capable and humble hands of Sisters Solamen Ott and Simon Zeta of the German Dominican Nuns in Akwatia, Eastern Region, Ghana.

Career
Amoah resolved to establish Boabab Advisors after years of working as a stockbroker and head of the Investment Banking and Finance division at Renaissance Capital in Ghana. She has served as director on several boards including that of Ghana Stock Exchange, the Ghana Venture Capital Trust Fund, Pioneer Aluminium, NewWorld Renaissance Securities, Strategic African Securities, and the Ghana Securities Industry Association. On the 15th of July, 2020, she was appointed as the Deputy Managing Director for Ghana Stock Exchange Abena Amoah becomes the new managing director of the Ghana Stock Exchange..

Achievements 

 She served as Director of the Ghana Stock Exchange
 She serves on the boards of the African Women's Development Fund as Director and Chairman of the Finance Committee
 She was a Governor on the Millennium Excellence Awards in 2005

References

Living people
University of Ghana alumni
21st-century Ghanaian businesswomen
21st-century Ghanaian businesspeople
Ghanaian company founders
Year of birth missing (living people)
Ghana Stock Exchange
Alumni of St Roses Senior High school (Akwatia)
Investment bankers
Women bankers